DXOR (102.3 FM), broadcasting as 102.3 Sunrise Gold FM, is a radio station owned and operated by Polytechnic Foundation of Cotabato & Asia. The studio is located in Capitol Hills, Mati, Davao Oriental.

References

Radio stations in Davao Oriental
Radio stations established in 2008